Venda was a territory in South Africa.

Venda may also refer to:
 Venda people, an ethnic group of South Africa and Zimbabwe
 Venda language, the language they speak
 University of Venda, in South Africa
 Venda Inc, a technology company
 Monte Venda, a mountain in  Italy
 La venda, a 2019 song
 Valeri F. Venda, Russian psychologist, engineer, and designer

Language and nationality disambiguation pages